Box Butte Reservoir State Recreation Area (SRA) is a state park in northwestern Nebraska, United States. The recreation area is managed by the Nebraska Game and Parks Commission. There are camping, fishing, swimming, and other recreational opportunities available.

Nearby points of interest include Chadron State Park, Fort Robinson State Park, and the Nebraska National Forest.

See also
Nebraska Game and Parks Commission
Nebraska Sandhills
Pine Ridge Region

References

External links
 Box Butte Reservoir State Recreation Area
 Nebraska Game and Parks Commission

Protected areas of Nebraska
State parks of Nebraska